Geographical Institute of Weimar was a German map publisher. It was based in Weimar, Germany. The company was founded in 1804 and made globes, yearbooks, and maps. Friedrich Justin Bertuch managed the company upon its founding. Adam Christian Gaspari and Heinrich Kiepert worked there.

References

Map companies of Germany
Companies based in Thuringia
Publishing companies of Germany